The MEB's 100 Fundamental Works, is a compiled book list recommendation by 59th Turkish Government Ministry of National Education (Turkey) to be taught to secondary schools students as curriculum course in Turkish Language and Literature, also as a reading activities for free times.

Books 
The list of works prepared to be taught in secondary schools and announced to the public is as follows:

Novels 
 Hunger (Knut Hamsun)
 Aganta Burina Burinata (Halikarnas Balıkçısı)
 Mediterranean (Panait Istrati)
 Ayaşlı ile Kiracıları (Memduh Şevket Esendal)
 Fathers and Sons (Ivan Turgenev)
 White Fang (Jack London)
 The White Ship (Chinghiz Aitmatov)
 Bir Bilim Adamının Romanı (Oğuz Atay)
 Cemo (Kemal Bilbaşar)
 Çalıkuşu (Reşat Nuri Güntekin)
 For Whom the Bell Tolls (Ernest Hemingway)
 Death and the Dervish (Meša Selimović)
 Dokuzuncu Hariciye Koğuşu (Peyami Safa)
 Don Quixote (Miguel de Cervantes)
 The Bridge on the Drina (Ivo Andrić)
 Drina'da Son Gün (Faik Baysal)
 Esir Şehrin İnsanları (Kemal Tahir)
 Eskici ve Oğulları (Orhan Kemal)
 Of Mice and Men (John Steinbeck)
 Fatih-Harbiye (Peyami Safa)
 Gora (Rabindranath Tagore)
 The Day Lasts More Than a Hundred Years (Chinghiz Aitmatov)
 İbrahim Efendi Konağı (Samiha Ayverdi)
 A Tale of Two Cities (Charles Dickens)
 Kalpaklılar (Samim Kocagöz)
 Kaplumbağalar (Fakir Baykurt)
 Karartma Geceleri (Rıfat Ilgaz)
 Kayıp Aranıyor (Sait Faik Abasıyanık)
 Kiralık Konak (Yakup Kadri Karaosmanoğlu)
 Kuyruklu Yıldız Altında Bir İzdivaç (Hüseyin Rahmi Gürpınar)
 Kuyucaklı Yusuf (Sabahattin Ali)
 Küçük Ağa (Tarık Buğra)
 Madame Bovary (Flaubert)
 Mai ve Siyah (Halit Ziya Uşaklıgil)
 Mor Salkımlı Ev (Halide Edib Adıvar)
 Onlar da İnsandı (Cengiz Dağcı)
 Dead Souls (Gogol)
 Robinson Crusoe (Daniel Defoe)
 Sahnenin Dışındakiler (Ahmet Hamdi Tanpınar)
 War and Peace (Tolstoy)
 Les Misérables (Victor Hugo)
 Sergüzeşt (Samipaşazade Sezai)
 The Sound and the Fury (William Faulkner)
 The Clown and His Daughter (Halide Edib Adıvar)
 Sokakta (Bahattin Özkişi)
 Crime and Punishment (Dostoyevski)
 Tütün Zamanı (Necati Cumalı) 
 Le Lys dans la vallée (Balzac)
 Yaban (Yakup Kadri Karaosmanoğlu)
 Yaşar Ne Yaşar Ne Yaşamaz (Aziz Nesin)
 Yedinci Gün (Orhan Hançerlioğlu)
 Yılkı Atı (Abbas Sayar)

Discourse 
 Nutuk (Mustafa Kemal Atatürk)

Play 
 Faust (Goethe)

Story 
 Çağlayanlar (Ahmet Hikmet Müftüoğlu)
 Book of Dede Korkut
 Gazoz Ağacı (Sabahattin Kudret Aksal)
 Gurbet Hikâyeleri (Refik Halit Karay)
 Gülistan (Sadi)
 Ömer Seyfettin Hikâyelerinden Seçmeler
 Haldun Taner Hikâyelerinden Seçmeler
 Sait Fait Abasıyanık Hikâyelerinden seçmeler
 Kelile ve Dimne (Beydeba)
 Kerem ile Aslı
 Memleket Hikâyeleri (Refik Halit Karay)

Poem 
 Orhan Veli Kanık'ın Bütün Şiirleri
 Çile (Necip Fazıl Kısakürek)
 Divan Şiirinden Seçmeler
 Dostlar Beni Hatırlasın (Aşık Veysel)
 Halk Şiirinden Seçmeler
 Han Duvarları (Faruk Nafiz Çamlıbel)
 Kendi Gök Kubbemiz (Yahya Kemal Beyatlı)
 Kutadgu Bilig'den Seçmeler
 Memleketimden İnsan Manzaraları (Nâzım Hikmet)
 Mesnevi'den Seçmeler (Mevlânâ)
 Otuz Beş Yaş (Cahit Sıtkı Tarancı)
 Safahat (Mehmet Âkif Ersoy)
 Ahmet Muhip Dıranas şiirlerinden seçmeler
 Ahmet Kutsi Tecer şiirlerinden seçmeler)
 Yunus Emre Divanı'ndan seçmeler

Assay 
 Beş Şehir (Ahmet Hamdi Tanpınar)
 Bize Göre (Ahmet Haşim)
 Boğaziçi Mehtapları (Abdülhak Şinasi Hisar)
 Boğaziçi Şıngır Mıngır (Salah Birsel)
 Bu Ülke (Cemil Meriç)
 Republic (Plato)
 Diyorlar Ki (Ruşen Eşref Günaydın)
 Eğil Dağlar (Yahya Kemal Beyatlı)
 Gençlerle Başbaşa (Ord. Prof. Dr. Ali Fuat Başgil)
 Apology of Socrates (Plato)
 Şehir Mektupları (Ahmet Rasim)
 Türkçenin Sırları (Nihad Sami Banarlı)

Travel 
 Anadolu Notları (Reşat Nuri Güntekin)
 Seyahatnâme (Evliya Çelebi)

Memory 
 Çankaya (Falih Rıfkı Atay)
 Zeytindağı (Falih Rıfkı Atay)

Biograph 
 Suyu Arayan Adam (Şevket Süreyya Aydemir)

Anecdote 
 Nasreddin Hoca Fıkralarından Seçmeler

Tales 
 Türk masalları (Naki Tezel)

References 

Ministry of National Education (Turkey)
Education in Turkey